Aaron McCargo Jr. (born July 22, 1971) is an American chef, television personality, and television show host who is best known as the winner of the fourth season of the Food Network's reality television show, The Next Food Network Star.

Early life and education
McCargo was born and also grew up in Camden, New Jersey, and is one of six children. He became interested in cooking at age four, when he began baking cakes in his sister's Easy-Bake Oven. He began cooking in his family's kitchen at age seven. He was encouraged by his father, Aaron McCargo, Sr., who is a fine cook, and his mother, Julia, who has a preference for food with a great deal of flavor. He first studied cooking in a home economics class at Pyne Poynt Middle School in Camden, and began cooking as a Junior Volunteer in the kitchen of Cooper University Hospital in Camden at age 13. He took further cooking classes at Camden High School, graduating in 1989. He attended the  Academy of Culinary Arts at Atlantic Cape Community College in Mays Landing, New Jersey, but did not complete the program, leaving after one year to assist his mother with the rearing of his brothers.

Professional life
Following his graduation from high school, McCargo took a month-long cake cooking class at Wilton Cake in Audubon, New Jersey, and began selling cakes and cookies throughout Camden. He has worked in nine restaurants in New Jersey (some while doing on-the-job training during his year at the Academy of Culinary Arts at Atlantic Cape Community College), including T.G.I. Friday's, Steak 38, Holmes Lounge, the Marlton Tavern, and the former Harbour League Club in Camden, and the Armadillo Steakhouse & Saloon in Edgewater Park, as sous chef; he also worked at the Armadillo Steakhouse & Saloon in Barrington. Aaron was introduced to the Burlington County area when he opened Citrus in Westampton Township with Ian Russo.

He opened his own restaurant, McCargo's Creative Cuisine, in 2003. The restaurant was located across from the U.S. Federal Courthouse on Cooper Street, near Rutgers University in Camden, and closed in 2005. He has worked as an executive chef, including at the catering division of Thomas Jefferson University Hospital in Philadelphia, where he oversaw approximately forty jobs per day. He left his job there on June 6, 2008 due to his demanding television schedule.

In 2008, McCargo entered the fourth season of Food Network's The Next Food Network Star at the urging of his wife. He beat out 3,990 other entrants as the winner of that year's competition, the finale of which aired on July 27, 2008. He was awarded a six-episode commitment for his own cooking show on Food Network. His show, Big Daddy's House, premiered on August 3, 2008 and ended June 18, 2011 with a total of 76 episodes. The show was ranked as the number one “in the kitchen” weekend show during its initial six-episode run. McCargo also was one of the contributing chefs to assist host Jon Taffer in saving various bar/restaurant establishments across America on the reality television series Bar Rescue during seasons 2-6.

Well known cable shopping network, QVC, announced on Wednesday, September 16, 2020 during its "In the Kitchen with David" show that Aaron McCargo would be joining the on air staff representing the Cook's Essentials line of products.  His QVC debut was on Sunday, September 20, 2020.

Personal life
McCargo lives in Cherry Hill, New Jersey. He has a Catholic background. His wife is named Kimberly (née Cosby) and they have three children.

McCargo has a strong Christian faith and is a member of The Living Hope Christian Center in Pennsauken Township, New Jersey. He enjoys playing tennis and watching boxing, as well as playing the drums and listening to music.

References

External links 

Big Daddy's House on FoodNetwork.com

1971 births
Living people
People from Camden, New Jersey
People from Cherry Hill, New Jersey
African-American Catholics
African-American television personalities
American television chefs
American male chefs
Atlantic Cape Community College alumni
Camden High School (New Jersey) alumni
Food Network chefs
Food Network Star winners
Catholics from New Jersey
21st-century African-American people
20th-century African-American people